The Albania Billie Jean King Cup team represents Albania in Billie Jean King Cup tennis competition and are governed by the Albanian Tennis Federation. They currently compete in the Europe/Africa Zone of Group III.

History
Albania competed in its first Billie Jean King Cup in 2021. Their best result was finishing third in their Group III pool in 2021.

Players

Recent performances
Here is the list of all match-ups of the Albania participation in the Billie Jean King Cup in 2021.

(i) = Played on an indoor court

See also
Billie Jean King Cup
Albania Davis Cup team

References

External links

Billie Jean King Cup teams
Billie Jean King Cup
Billie Jean King Cup